Capt. Jonathan Nichols Sr. (10 June 1681 – 2 August 1727) was a deputy governor of the Colony of Rhode Island and Providence Plantations.  He was the son of Thomas and Hannah Nichols of Newport.  Nichols became a freeman of Newport in 1707, then served many years as either Deputy or Assistant from 1713 to 1727.  In 1718 he was called Captain, and in 1721 he was appointed to a committee to rebuild or repair Fort Ann on Goat Island.  In May 1727 Nichols was selected as the Deputy Governor of the Rhode Island colony, but he died in office less than three months later in August, and Thomas Frye completed his term.

While his father was an original legatee of the town of East Greenwich, he and his family remained in Newport.  With his wife, Elizabeth, the daughter of Robert and Mary (Wodell) Lawton, he had eight children born from 1708 to 1723.  Nichols is buried in the Nichols-Hassard Burial Ground in Portsmouth, Rhode Island.

See also

 Jonathan Nichols Jr. for ancestral chart
 List of lieutenant governors of Rhode Island
 List of colonial governors of Rhode Island
 Colony of Rhode Island and Providence Plantations

References

Bibliography

Further reading

External links
State list of lieutenant governors of Rhode Island

1681 births
1727 deaths
Politicians from Newport, Rhode Island
People of colonial Rhode Island
Burials in Rhode Island